Pichet In-bang (Thai พิเชษฐ์ อินทร์บาง) is a Thai retired footballer who played as a forward and attacking midfielder. Previously he played in the Thai League 1 for several clubs.

References

1982 births
Living people
Pichet In-bang
Pichet In-bang
Pichet In-bang
Pichet In-bang
Pichet In-bang
Pichet In-bang
Pichet In-bang
Pichet In-bang
Pichet In-bang
Pichet In-bang
Pichet In-bang
Association football forwards